Ouazebas (late 4th century) was a King of the Kingdom of Aksum. He is primarily known through the coins that were minted during his reign.

Ouazebas' coins were found beneath the remains of the largest stela in the city of Axum. This suggests that the stele had fallen as early as his reign. S. C. Munro-Hay suggests that this particular stela was the last one erected, and that "possibly they went out of favor as Christianity spread, bringing with it new ideas about burial.

Ouazebas reintroduced on his coins a motto from the time of Ezana: TOYTOAPECHTHXWPA, meaning "May this please the people". Munro-Hay comments that this motto is "a rather attractive peculiarity of Aksumite coinage, giving a feeling of royal concern and responsibility towards the people's wishes and contentment".

Notes 

Kings of Axum
4th-century monarchs in Africa